Basque pelota was on the program for the second time at the 2003 Pan American Games in Santo Domingo, Dominican Republic.

Men's events

Women's events

Open events

Events at the 2003 Pan American Games
2003
2003 Pan American Games
Basque pelota competitions in the Dominican Republic